Babawiin Ko ang Lahat (International title: All or Nothing / is a 2021 Philippine television drama revenge series broadcast by GMA Network. Directed by Jules Katanyag, it stars Pauline Mendoza. It premiered on February 22, 2021, on the network's Afternoon Prime line up replacing Prima Donnas. The series concluded on May 21, 2021, with a total of 63 episodes.

Cast and characters

Lead cast
 Pauline Mendoza as Iris Allegre-Salvador

Supporting cast
 Carmina Villarroel as Dulce Espejo / Dulce Salvador 
 Tanya Garcia as Christine Allegre-Salvador
 Kristofer Martin as Joel Espejo-Salvador
 Dave Bornea as Randall Madrigal
 John Estrada as Victor Salvador
 Therese Malvar as Lalaine "Lala" Vasquez
 Tanya Gomez as Menchie Salvador
 Gio Alvarez as Greg Madrigal
 Manolo Pedrosa as Justin Roxas
 Liezel Lopez as Katrina "Trina" Espejo / Katrina "Trina" Salvador

Guest cast
 Neil Ryan Sese as Jun Roxas
 Jett Pangan as Akira Tanaka
 Charee Pineda as Minnie Cruz
 Jenine Desiderio as Elena Allegre
 Mirriam Manalo as Ada

Episodes

Production
Principal photography commenced in November 2020.

Ratings
According to AGB Nielsen Philippines' Nationwide Urban Television Audience Measurement People in television homes, the pilot episode of Babawiin Ko ang Lahat earned a 10.4% rating. While the final episode scored a 9.6% rating.

References

External links
 
 

2021 Philippine television series debuts
2021 Philippine television series endings
Filipino-language television shows
GMA Network drama series
Television shows set in the Philippines